Rhadine is a genus of beetles in the family Carabidae, containing the following species:

Species
These 56 species belong to the genus Rhadine:

 Rhadine albamontana Dajoz, 1998 i c g
 Rhadine anthicoides Casey, 1913 i c g
 Rhadine araizai (Bolívar y Pieltain, 1944) i c g
 Rhadine austinica Barr, 1974 i c g b
 Rhadine babcocki (Barr, 1960) i b
 Rhadine balesi (Gray, 1937) i c g
 Rhadine bolivari Barr, 1982 c g
 Rhadine bullis Reddell and Cokendolpher, 2004 i c g
 Rhadine caudata (Leconte, 1863)
 Rhadine chipinque Barr, 1982 c g
 Rhadine constricta Casey, 1913 i c g
 Rhadine dissecta (Leconte, 1863)
 Rhadine elliotti Barr, 1982 c g
 Rhadine euprepes (Bates, 1882) c g
 Rhadine exilis (Barr and Lawrence, 1960) i c g
 Rhadine gracilenta Casey, 1913
 Rhadine grubbsi Reddell and Dupérré, 2009 i c g
 Rhadine hendrichsi Barr, 1982 c g
 Rhadine howdeni (Barr & Lawrence, 1960) i c g b
 Rhadine infernalis (Barr & Lawrence, 1960) i c g b
 Rhadine insolita Barr, 1974 i c g
 Rhadine ivyi Reddell and Cokendolpher, 2004 i c g
 Rhadine jejuna (Leconte, 1878)
 Rhadine koepkei (Barr, 1960) i c g
 Rhadine lanei (Gray, 1937) i c g
 Rhadine larvalis Leconte, 1848
 Rhadine leptodes (Bates, 1882) c g
 Rhadine lindrothi Barr, 1965 i c g b
 Rhadine longiceps Vandyke, 1949
 Rhadine longicollis Benedict, 1927 i c g
 Rhadine longipes Casey, 1913 i c g
 Rhadine medellini Bolivar, Pieltain & Hendrichs, 1964
 Rhadine myrmecodes (G.horn, 1892)
 Rhadine nivalis (G.horn, 1881)
 Rhadine noctivaga Barr, 1974 i c g
 Rhadine ozarkensis Sanderson & Miller, 1941 i c g b
 Rhadine pelaezi Bolivar, Pieltain & Hendrichs, 1964
 Rhadine perlevis Casey, 1913 i c g
 Rhadine persephone Barr, 1974 i c g
 Rhadine pertenuis Casey, 1920 i c g
 Rhadine plumasensis Casey, 1920
 Rhadine pugetana Casey, 1920 c g
 Rhadine reddelli Barr, 1982 c g
 Rhadine reyesi Reddell and Cokendolpher, 2001 i c g
 Rhadine rossi Vandyke, 1949
 Rhadine rotgeri Bolivar, Pieltain & Hendrichs, 1964
 Rhadine rubra (Barr, 1960) i c g
 Rhadine russelli Barr, 1974 i c g
 Rhadine specum (Barr, 1960) i c g
 Rhadine sprousei Reddell and Cokendolpher, 2004 i c g
 Rhadine sublustris Casey, 1913 i c g
 Rhadine subterranea (Vandyke, 1918)
 Rhadine tenebrosa (Barr, 1960) i c g
 Rhadine tenuipes Casey, 1920
 Rhadine testacea Casey, 1920 i c g
 Rhadine umbra Casey, 1913 i c g
Data sources: i = ITIS, c = Catalogue of Life, g = GBIF, b = Bugguide.net

Habitat and ecology

The genus Rhadine as a whole is very widespread. They live in moist and cool environments. An indicator of evolutionary history, it is typically found in southwestern Texas. Several species are only found in mountaintops while others are restricted to deep caves or more general subterranean habitats. However, no food habits are known in any species of the genus Rhadine but the family of carabids are typically predaceous. Carabid beetle species diversity, community composition, and wing-state act as ecological indicators of forest age. The genus therefore, is an appealing group for studying regressive evolution (the reduction or total loss of traits over time) and biogeography.

References

Platyninae
Carabidae genera